Lysane Blanchette-Lamothe (born April 7, 1984) is a Canadian politician. She was elected Member of Parliament for the riding of Pierrefonds—Dollard in the 2011 Canadian federal election as a member of the New Democratic Party, defeating longtime Liberal MP Bernard Patry.

Born in Montreal, Quebec, she has a teaching diploma from the Université du Québec à Trois-Rivières in Special Education and is currently pursuing her Master's Degree in education at Université du Québec à Trois-Rivières. She has worked as a teacher in the Montreal area and in an Inuit school in northern Quebec.

She has lived in her riding for most of her life, and has been active in community work. She has worked with organizations alleviating poverty, and has taken part in events such as the Marche des femmes and demonstrations against high tuition.

Lysane was defeated in the 2015 election by Liberal Frank Baylis.

Electoral record

Source: Elections Canada

References

External links

1984 births
Women members of the House of Commons of Canada
Living people
Members of the House of Commons of Canada from Quebec
New Democratic Party MPs
Politicians from Montreal
Université du Québec à Trois-Rivières alumni
21st-century Canadian politicians
21st-century Canadian women politicians